Linish is the process of using grinding or belt sanding techniques to improve the flatness of a surface. The flatness may be two-dimensional, i.e. with the view of achieving a flat plate, or one-dimensional, e.g. with the view of achieving a perfectly cylindrical shape. The machine that does this may be called a linisher or a linish grinder. The technique may also be used, with finer grades of grindstone or sanding belt, to polish a surface.

A specific use of the term linishing is for the preparation of the ends of rubber extrusions that will be fused together to make a closed loop.

External links

Grinding and lapping
Machine tools
Metalworking tools